Billy Joe Boles (July 27, 1938 – December 9, 2021) was a retired United States Air Force four-star general.  At the time of his retirement, he was Commander of the Air Education and Training Command, a 70,000-person organization, responsible for recruiting, training and educating Air Force personnel. He served for more than three years as the Senior Personnel Officer for the US Air Force, at that time a 700,000-person organization, worldwide.  In his early career, Bill served in key leadership positions throughout the Air Force, to include four tours of duty at Air Force headquarters in Washington DC. During his command and staff assignments he had extensive experience in media relations and in presenting Air Force programs to congressional committees.

Education 
1961 Bachelor of Science degree in agricultural education, North Carolina State University, Raleigh, North Carolina
1966 Squadron Officer School, Maxwell Air Force Base, Alabama
1973 Armed Forces Staff College, Norfolk, Virginia
1981 National War College, Fort Lesley J. McNair, Washington, D.C.

Assignments 
March 1962 – September 1962, assistant officer in charge and officer in charge, Student Record Section, Keesler Air Force Base, Mississippi
September 1962 – June 1964, instructor and assistant course supervisor, Personnel Officer Course, Greenville Air Force Base, Mississippi
June 1964 – June 1965, supervisor and instructor, Personnel Officer Course, Amarillo Air Force Base, Texas
July 1965 – October 1965, personnel officer, 6250th Combat Support Group, Tan Son Nhut Air Base, South Vietnam
October 1965 – October 1966, instructor, Personnel Officer Course, Amarillo Air Force Base, Texas
October 1966 – June 1967, chief, assignments division, Headquarters 7th Air Force, Tan Son Nhut Air Base, South Vietnam
June 1967 – June 1969, assignment policy and procedure officer, Air Force Military Personnel Center, Randolph Air Force Base, Texas
June 1969 – June 1970, personnel management system planning officer, Air Force Military Personnel Center, Randolph Air Force Base, Texas
June 1970 – August 1972, assistant executive officer to the commander, Air Force Military Personnel Center, Randolph Air Force Base, Texas
August 1972 – January 1973, student, Armed Forces Staff College, Norfolk, Virginia
January 1973 – April 1977, chief, special activities division, then chief, regular and reserve division, Office of the Assistant for General Officer Matters, Headquarters U.S. Air Force, Washington, D.C.
May 1977 – August 1980, executive to the commander, Headquarters Tactical Air Command, Langley Air Force Base, Virginia
August 1980 – August 1981, student, National War College, Fort Lesley J. McNair, Washington, D.C.
August 1981 – April 1983, chief, plans division, directorate of personnel plans, Headquarters U.S. Air Force, Washington, D.C.
April 1983 – June 1985, assistant deputy chief of staff, then deputy chief of staff for personnel, Headquarters Tactical Air Command, Langley Air Force Base, Virginia
June 1985 – June 1987, vice commander and assistant deputy chief of staff, personnel for military personnel, Air Force Military Personnel Center, Randolph Air Force Base, Texas
June 1987 – July 1988, director, personnel programs, Headquarters U.S. Air Force, Washington, D.C.
July 1988 – October 1991, assistant deputy chief of staff, personnel for military personnel and commander, Air Force Military Personnel Center, Randolph Air Force Base, Texas
October 1991 – April 1995, deputy chief of staff for personnel, Headquarters U.S. Air Force, Washington, D.C.
April 1995 – June 1995, vice commander, Headquarters Air Education and Training Command, Randolph Air Force Base, Texas
June 1995 – April 1997, commander, Headquarters Air Education and Training Command, Randolph Air Force Base, Texas

Major awards and decorations

References

1938 births
2021 deaths
United States Air Force generals
Recipients of the Legion of Merit
United States Air Force personnel of the Vietnam War
North Carolina State University alumni
People from King, North Carolina